Kara Nova is a pole acrobat in the San Francisco Bay area, California.

Career 

Kara Nova moved to San Francisco from Ohio when she was 18. She performs regularly as a pole acrobat in venues along the West Coast with burlesque troupe Hubba Hubba Revue, and with avant-garde cabaret circus troupe The Vau de Vire Society.

In July 2011, Kara Nova featured in the Hubba Hubba Revue's poster as pole acrobat/saint being burnt at the stake, with the burlesque captions "Old Time Religion" and "Plate 15. Kara Nova. Foxy's Book of Martyrs" - a play on Foxe's Book of Martyrs.

Reception 

According to reviewers, Kara Nova is an exceptionally strong acrobat and an impressive performer. Der Spiegel commented (in German) "Strip Clubs? Topless bars? Cheap Callgirls? Forget it. Pole Dance has long been a trend sport, and Kara Nova is one of the best dancers in the United States. The 22-year-old is all muscle, and performs feats which are frivolous, lascivious - but never vulgar."  SF Weekly wrote "Kara Nova's 'Burned at the Cross' pole dance routine is a must see."

References

External links 

 Artist's website
 SF Weekly
 Der Spiegel (in German)
 Vau de Vire Society (photo of Kara Nova)
 DNA Lounge (poster of Kara Nova)

Acrobats
American acrobatic gymnasts
Female acrobatic gymnasts